The 1895 VAMC football team represented Virginia Agricultural and Mechanical College in the 1895 college football season. The team was led by their head coach Arlie C. Jones and finished with a record of four wins and two losses (4–2).

Schedule

Players
The following players were members of the 1895 football team according to the roster published in the 1896 and 1903 editions of The Bugle, the Virginia Tech yearbook.

Season summary

Virginia

On October 5, 1895, VAMC played their first game of the season against the University of Virginia at Madison Hall Field in Charlottesville, Virginia and lost 0–36. Virginia scored in the first five minutes of the game, with a rushing touchdown by quarterback Archie Hoxton. VAMC failed to get within 25 yards of the end zone during the entire game.

St. Albans
VAMC played St. Albans Boys Lutheran School on October 12, 1895 and won 12–0 in front of 600 spectators. Neither team scored points in the first half, but VAMC scored two touchdowns in the second half, with T. D. Martin kicking two successful extra points.

Washington and Lee
VAMC played their third game of the season on October 26, 1895 against Washington and Lee University in Lexington, VA with 500 in attendance. VAMC halfback A. P. Eskridge recorded a forty five-yard run and a touchdown, and halfback J. Lewis Ingles had an eighty five-yard touchdown run. The other touchdowns were scored by Miles Hart (2) and William Mayer.

Roanoke YMCA
On November 9, 1895, VAMC played against the Roanoke YMCA on the Roanoke Athletic Club grounds in front of 300 people. VAMC scored a touchdown within the first ten minutes of play, and then on the next drive, VAMC turned the ball over on downs. Roanoke then passed the ball to their fullback Meade, who then attempted a failed dropkick. On the very next play, VAMC scored a rushing touchdown. VAMC then scored again six minutes into the second half. Roanoke was then able to drive down the field and made it to the four-yard line, but then their halfback S. Handy fumbled and it was recovered by VAMC. However, Roanoke YMCA was then able to record a safety, their only points of the game. The game was then called because of darkness, and VAMC won 16–2.

North Carolina

VAMC lost a second game on November 16, 1895 against the University of North Carolina in Charlotte, North Carolina with 1,000 looking on. North Carolina scored three touchdowns in the first half and then scored two more touchdowns in the second half. VAMC then drove to North Carolina's three-yard line, but was stopped on downs. The final score was 5–32.

VMI

On November 28, 1895, VAMC played their final game of the season against the Virginia Military Institute in Lynchburg, Virginia in front 3,000 spectators. VMI was the first team to put points on the board, when their halfback Dickinson scored a rushing touchdown at the end of the first half. However, VAMC's Miles Hart was able to rush into the end zone for a touchdown and R. N. Watts kicked the extra point to win the game, 6–4.

References

VAMC
Virginia Tech Hokies football seasons
VAMC football